John Russell was an English politician. He was the Member of Parliament for Westminster, London in 1545–1547 along with Robert Smallwood.

References

English MPs 1545–1547
Politics of London
Year of death missing
Year of birth missing
Place of birth missing
People from Westminster